is a Japanese manga written and illustrated by Aoi Kujyou. It is licensed in North America by Digital Manga Publishing, which released the manga through its imprint, Juné, on 19 December 2007.

Reception
Patricia Beard, writing for Mania, noted Kujyou's "understated" approach, welcoming it as a relief from other "overwrought" yaoi, but feeling that the title story's couple were "dull" and did not show a connection. Leroy Douresseaux, writing for Comic Book Bin, described the title story as being a "drawn out, melodramatic love story that would fit a romance novel", and praised Kujiyou's character designs.  Rachel Bentham, writing for Active Anime, noted that tales about long-distance relationships are "rare in yaoi", and also noted the explicitness was reduced for the title story when compared to the bonus stories.

References

External links

Manga anthologies
2004 manga
Yaoi anime and manga
Digital Manga Publishing titles